Spangler is an unincorporated community in Randolph County, West Virginia, United States.

Climate
The climate in this area has mild differences between highs and lows, and there is adequate rainfall year-round.  According to the Köppen Climate Classification system, Spangler has a marine west coast climate, abbreviated "Cfb" on climate maps.

References 

Unincorporated communities in West Virginia
Unincorporated communities in Randolph County, West Virginia